Freedom Records was a record label that was based in Houston, Texas.  It was founded in 1948 by Sol Kahal.  It originally specialized in rhythm and blues but expanded to include country and pop music. Among its recording artists were Big Joe Turner, L. C. Williams, Goree Carter and Little Willie Littlefield.  The label lasted through the early 1950s. All releases were 78s.  

The catalogue is currently owned by Fivepin Music based in Toronto. 

Discography
1200A Perry Cain - My Heart Belongs To You
1200B Perry Cain - Big Timing Grandma
1501A Conny's Combo - I Don'T Want Your Baby
1501B Conny's Combo - Won'T You Please Come Back
1502A Goree Carter - Sweet Old Woman's Blues
1502B Little Willie Littlefield - Littlefield Boogie
1504A Lonnie Lyons - Lonely Heart Blues
1505B Lonnie Lyons - Barrelhouse Nightcap
1506A Goree Carter and His Hepcats - Back Home Blues
1506B Goree Carter - Rock Awhile
1507A Lonnie Lyons - Far Away Blues
1507B Lonnie Lyons - Flychick Blues
1509A Leroy Country Johnson - No One To Love Me
1509B Leroy Country Johnson - Log House On The Hill
1510A Conny's Combo with L.C. Williams - That's Alright
1510B Conny's Combo with L.C. Williams - Gonna Change My Love
1511A Goree Carter - I'll Send You
1511B Goree Carter - How Can You Love Me
1512A Lonnie Lyons - Neat And Sweet Part 1
1512B Lonnie Lyons - Neat And Sweet Part 2
1513A Jesse Thomas - Guess I'll Walk Alone
1513B Jesse Thomas - Let's Have Some Fun
1516A Goree Carter - Hoy Hoy
1516B Goree Carter - I Just Thought Of You
1517A L.C. Williams - Shout Baby Shout
1517B L.C. Williams - Ethel Mae
1518A Goree Carter - She's Just Old Fashioned
1518B Goree Carter - Is It True
1519A Lonnie Lyons - Helpless
1519B Lonnie Lyons - Down In The Groovy
1520A Connie Mac Booker - Loretta
1520B Connie Mac Booker - My Baby Left Me
1523A Lonnie Lyons - Betrayed
1523B Lonnie Lyons - Sneaky Joe
1524A L.C. Williams And Conney's Combo - Jelly Roll
1524B L.C. Williams And Conney's Combo - Louisiana Boogie
1528 A Carl Campbell - Getting High
1528 B Carl Campbell - Goin' Down To Nashville
1529A L.C. Williams - All Through My Dreams
1529B L.C. Williams - Mean And Evil Blues
1531A Joe Turner - Still In The Dark
1531B Joe Turner - Adam Bit The Apple
1533A Clarence Samuels - Low Top Inn
1533B Clarence Samuels - Lost My Head
1535A Joe Houston - Jumpin' The Blues
1535B Joe Houston - Your Little Girl Is Gone
1536 B Goree Carter - Serenade
1536A Goree Carter - C'Mon Let's Boogie
1537A Joe Turner - Just A Travellin' Man
1537B Joe Turner - Life Is Like A Card Game
1538A Texas Alexander And Benton's Busy Bees - Bottoms Blues
1538B Texas Alexander And Benton's Busy Bees - Crossroads
1539A Sammy Harris And Orchestra - King Zulu
1539B Sammy Harris And Orchestra - Fatso
1540A Joe Turner - After While You'Ll Be Sorry
1540B Joe Turner - Feelin' Happy
1542A L.C. Williams - My Darkest Hours
1542B L.C. Williams - I Want My Baby Back
1544A Clarence Samuels - Somebody Gotta Go
1544B Clarence Samuels - Hey Joe!
1545A Joe Turner - I Want My Baby
1545B Joe Turner - Midnight Is Here Again
1546B Joe Turner - Lonely World
1563A Stubby Stubblefield - Buggy Wuggy Love
1563B Stubby Stubblefield - Wurry Wurry Wurry
5000A Billie Stevens And Paul - Moonlight And Roses
5000B Billie Stevens And Paul - Send Me The Pillow That You Dream On
5001A Dickie Jones And Rhythm Rangers - Houston Texas Blues
5001B Joan Brooks - Salt Your Pillow Down
5001B Dickie Jones And Rhythm Rangers - Be Careful Little Darlin'
5003A Joan Brooks - Heading Back To Houston
5005A Jimmy Spear And The Bluebonnet Boys - Turn Me 'Round
5005B Jimmy Spear And The Bluebonnet Boys - Mad At My Heart
5007A Benny Leaders With Western Rangers - In A Land Of Broken Dreams
5007B Benny Leaders With Western Rangers - Think Of Me
5008A Pete Hunter And The Dude Ramblers - The Tater Tune
5008B Pete Hunter And The Dude Ramblers - Wrapped In Cellophane
5009A Jimmy Johnson With Jack Rhodes Ramblers - Salt Your Pillow Down
5009B Jimmy Johnson With Jack Rhodes Ramblers - Could You
5010A Cotton Thompson And The Village Boys - Let's Keep Our Love Affair
5010B Cotton Thompson And The Village Boys - Jelly Roll Blues
5012A Benny Leaders With Western Rangers - Boots Don'T Leave Me
5012B Benny Leaders With Western Rangers - I've Got The Craziest Feeling
5014A Trail Blazers And Carol - (A Cowboy's) Silent Light
5014B Trail Blazers And George - Little Mohee
5015A Hub Sutter And His Hub Caps - I Don'T Want My Baby Back
5015B Hub Sutter And His Hub Caps - I Live Only For You
5016A Drew Lewis And Wink Lewis' Dude Ranchers - What's A Matter Baby
5016B Drew Lewis And Wink Lewis' Dude Ranchers - A Love A Dream A Prayer
5018A Johnny Nelms And The Sunset Cowboys - Bride To Be
5018B Johnny Nelms And The Sunset Cowboys - If I Can't Have You
5020A Benny Leaders And The Western Rangers - Harbor Lights
5021A Jimmy Spear And The Bluebonnet Boys - Heart Carved In A Tree
5021A Jimmy Spear And The Bluebonnet Boys - Heart Carved In A Tree
5021B Jimmy Spear And The Bluebonnet Boys - Heart Wrapped In Love
5022A Little Tommy Sands - Syrup Soppin' Blues
5022B Jimmy Spear And The Bluebonnet Boys - Heart Wrapped In Love
5022B Little Tommy Sands - Love Pains
5023A Bob Jones And His Troubadors - Somebody's Stealin' My Baby's Kisses
5023B Bob Jones And His Troubadors - The Dream I Had Of You
5025A Tommy Durden And The Westernaires - Crossroads
5025B Tommy Durden And The Westernaires - Hula Boogie
5027A Laura Lee And The Ranch Hands - Everyone But Me
5027B Laura Lee And The Ranch Hands - I'M Lonely For You Darling
5028A Peck Touchton And The Sunset Wranglers - Walk 'Em Off Blues
5028B Peck Touchton And The Sunset Wranglers - Lonely World
5029A Bennie Leaders And The Western Rangers - Why Don'T You Leave My Heart Alone
5029B Bernie Leaders And The Rangers Trio - Naggin' Woman
5030A Hub Sutter And His Hubcats - Tellin' My Baby Bye Bye
5030B Hub Sutter And His Hubcats - How Can You Love Me
5031A Jimmy Johnson With Jack Rhodes Ramblers - Always Remember
5031B Jimmy Johnson With Jack Rhodes Ramblers - Warm Beer And A Cold Cold Woman
5033A Charlie Harris And D Hendon's Western - Those Tears In Your Eyes
5033B Charlie Harris And D Hendon's Western - No Shoes Boogie
5037A Tex And Shorty Dunn - Don'T Break My Heart Little Darling
5037B Tex And Shorty Dunn - Walking Home From An Old Country School
5038A Benny Leaders And The Ranger Trio - Give My Heart A Break
5038B Benny Leaders And The Ranger Trio - Always Remember
5039A Louis Lamb And He Melody Boys - I Will Trouble You No More
5039B Louis Lamb And He Melody Boys - Down Hill And Shady
5040A Coye Wilcox - It's Nobody's Business (What We Do)
5040B Coye Wilcox - Look What Love Has Done To Me
5041A Peck Touchton - Walkin' On Top Of The World
5041B Peck Touchton - Sighing Trees And A Broken Heart
5042A Tex Jones And His Texas Rangers - A Gambler's Last Hand
5042B Tex Jones And His Texas Rangers - Little Darlin'
SP 103 B Rev. Frank M. Johnson - Only A Look
SP 103 A Rev. Frank M. Johnson - How Jesus Brought Me Out
SP 104A Silvertone Gospel Singers - I'll Make It Alright
SP 104B Silvertone Gospel Singers - Where Shall I Be
SP112A The Loyal Five - John The Revelator
SP112B The Loyal Five - You'd Better Run

References

American record labels
Record labels established in 1948